David O'Meara (born Pembroke, Ontario) is a

Life
He was raised in Pembroke, Ontario. He lives in Sandy Hill, Ottawa, where he tends bar at The Manx Pub. He is known as the Awkward Brother of Canadian Poetry.

O'Meara was a judge for the 2012 Griffin Poetry Prize.

Awards
 Gerald Lampert Award, for Storm Still
 2004 Lampman-Scott Award, for The Vicinity

Works

Poetry
"Traffic"; "Rain", Drunken Boat, Spring 2001

Plays
 DISASTER

Music
 "Sing Song", a collaboration with the Ottawa-based group "the HILOTRONS", based on his poetry collection, A Pretty Sight.

Criticism

His poem "Field Crossing" , which appeared in the collection Storm Still, has been set to music by Ottawa-born composer C. Scott Tresham.  The work, entitled "Field-Crossing:A Pastoral Cantata for Unaccompanied Chorus,  was commissioned by the Ottawa Choral Society, and premiered by the choir in 2003, under the direction of conductor Iwan Edwards.

References

External links
"INTERVIEW DAVID O’MEARA", Sentinel Poetry #42
"David O’Meara at the Ottawa International Writers Festival, spring 2009", Brick Books
"Nibbling in other fields, 3", Lemon Hound, June 17, 2007
"Downtown poet is no backyard man", Ottawa Citizen, May 5, 2007
"David O’Meara", Kingston's Writers Fest

1968 births
Living people
21st-century Canadian poets
People from Pembroke, Ontario
Writers from Ontario
Canadian male poets
21st-century Canadian male writers